Arliss is a surname which may refer to:

Dimitra Arliss (1932–2012), American actress
George Arliss (1868–1946), English actor, author, playwright and filmmaker
Leslie Arliss (1901–1987), English screenwriter and director
Ralph Arliss (born 1947), British actor

English masculine given names
English-language surnames
Surnames of British Isles origin